The Wild and the Brave, also known as Two Men of Karamoja, is a 1974 American documentary film directed by Eugene S. Jones. The film portrays the relationship between Iain Ross, the outgoing British Chief Warden of Kidepo Valley National Park, and his Ugandan replacement Paul Ssali. It portrays the racial and cultural tensions and amity of the postcolonial handover from 1970 to 1972.

It was nominated for an Academy Award for Best Documentary Feature.

References

External links

1974 films
American documentary films
1974 documentary films
Documentary films about Uganda
1970s English-language films
1970s American films